The 2022–23 Holy Cross Crusaders men's basketball team represented the College of the Holy Cross in the 2022–23 NCAA Division I men's basketball season. The Crusaders, led by fourth-year head coach Brett Nelson, played their home games at the Hart Center in Worcester, Massachusetts as members of the Patriot League. they finished the season 10–22, 7–11 in Patriot League play to finish in a four-way tie for sixth place. As the No. 9 seed in the Patriot League tournament, they lost to Loyola (MD) in the first round.

Previous season
The Crusaders finished the 2021–22 season 9–22, 7–11 in Patriot League play to finish in a tie for seventh place. In the Patriot League tournament, they were defeated by American in the first round.

Roster

Schedule and results

|-
!colspan=12 style=""| Non-conference regular season

|-
!colspan=12 style=""| Patriot League regular season

|-
!colspan=9 style=| Patriot League tournament

|-

Sources

References

Holy Cross Crusaders men's basketball seasons
Holy Cross
Holy Cross Crusaders men's basketball
Holy Cross Crusaders men's basketball